Huddersfield Town's 1951–52 campaign was Town's 32nd consecutive season in the 1st Division, but relegation would send Town to the 2nd Division since the 1919–20 season. Under the leadership of George Stephenson, Town recorded some of their worst ever results in their history, including 7–1 defeats by Wolverhampton Wanderers and Sunderland, as well as a 6–2 defeat by Newcastle United.

Squad at the start of the season

Review
Since the end of World War II, Town's league form was in dire need of a boost, but unfortunately George Stephenson's team would soon find out the hard way that staying in Division 1 would be harder than even he imagined. Things weren't made easier with dreadful results against Wolverhampton Wanderers, Preston North End, Newcastle United and Sunderland.

Stephenson would leave Leeds Road in March and would be replaced by Stockport County manager Andy Beattie before the end of the season. Town finished in 21st place with 28 points, 3 points behind 20th placed Stoke City.

Squad at the end of the season

Results

Division One

FA Cup

Appearances and goals

1951–52
English football clubs 1951–52 season